Stanton is an unincorporated community located in the town of Stanton, St. Croix County, Wisconsin, United States.

History
A post office called Stanton was in operation from 1880 until 1913. The community was named for Edwin M. Stanton, 27th United States Secretary of War.

Notes

Unincorporated communities in St. Croix County, Wisconsin
Unincorporated communities in Wisconsin